Brahmaso Humanitarian Aid Organisation (abbreviated BHAO) is a humanitarian aid organisation based on Mandalay, Myanmar. The organisation is Myanmar's oldest free funeral service organisation.

It was founded by Tikkha, the abbot of the Southern Salin Monastery in 1998, initially providing free funeral services. It has since expanded to providing health care services, as well as education and natural disaster relief services.

See also
 Free Funeral Service Society

References

External links
 Official website (English)
 Official website (Burmese)

Non-profit organisations based in Myanmar
Organizations established in 1998
1998 establishments in Myanmar
Humanitarian aid organizations